The Belizean Writers Series, published by local media house Cubola Productions, preserves some of the best of Belizean arts and letters, mainly poetry and short stories. The series began in 1995 and is currently ongoing.

The General Editor of the series is Michael D. Phillips.

Books in the Belizean Writers Series

Snapshots of Belize: An Anthology of Belizean Short Fiction (1995) 
Deals with short fiction published in the previous thirty years. With the exception of "Crab Seasin", written entirely in Belize Creole, all stories were in English.

Authors represented 
 Leo Bradley:
 Elastic Gold: A fisherman and his son attempt to outrun shady characters who want the floating rubber that represents a chance at a better life.
 The Day of the Bridge: The Belize City Swing Bridge is the villain of this story about a youth whose chance for happiness is destroyed by a series of unfortunate circumstances.
 Sir Colville Young:
 The Representative: This selection from Pataki Full takes aim at Belizean politicians in the guise of the slippery Jonas Parker, who learns a hard lesson about the nature of politics for poor people.
 Sugar: Also from Pataki Full; Orange Walk restaurateur has run-in with elderly customer who must resort to shadiness to stay alive.
 Zoila Ellis:
The Teacher: Taken from On Heroes, Lizards and Passion; a priest and teacher attempts to find peace in a village in rural Belize, but not before facing his past.
 Evan X Hyde:
A Conscience for Christmas: Would-be player Caldo meets his match in a "Christmas Carol"-esque episode in Belize City.
 John Alexander Watler:
Bitter Sweet Revenge: College-educated youths pursue attractive sisters but find trouble in the form of their father.
 Lawrence Vernon:
The Third Wish: Be careful what you wish for? A seemingly innocent stone brought home by archaeologist Jim Hilton spells trouble for his family.
 Evadne Wade Garcia:
Crab Seasin: Remembrance of a playful episode involving city boys in search of crab meat, a local delicacy.

Ping Wing Juk Me: Six Belizean Plays (1998) 
Six original plays written and performed in Belize between 1970 and the time of publication were included in this volume:
 Carol Fonseca Galvez, Shame on You Tiky Bood: The titular character attempts to fool his wife in order to go to a party, but is found out and tricked himself.
 Sir Colville Young, Riding Haas: theatrical adaptation of a story featuring the trickster spider Anansi, who plays a clever trick on nemesis Braa Tiger to prove a point.
 Gladys Stuart, Dog and Iguana: Moral fable about the value of company.
 Shirley Warde, When My Father Comes Home: The absentee father of a youth sentenced to hang tries to reason with his mother about the circumstances leading to his death.
 George Gabb, Yellowtail: Philosophical story about four men trying to understand their roots.
 Evan X Hyde, Haad Time: Deals with the topic of teenage pregnancy from the eyes of a young Belize City couple.

Of Words: An Anthology of Belizean Poetry (1999) 
Features poems by a number of Belizean authors, young and old, published and unpublished.

If Di Pin Neva Ben: Folktales and Legends of Belize (2001) 
Covers folktales and mythological legends native to Belize and surrounding areas.

Contributors 
 Mary Gomez Parham
 Dr. Timothy Hagerty
 Dr. Ervin Beck
 David Ruiz
 Jessie Castillo
 Elizabeth Cardenas
 Ines Sanchez
 Daviid Vansen
 Colin Bradley
 Willy A. Villalda
 Tata Balam

Memories, Dreams and Nightmares: A Short Story Anthology by Belizean Women Writers

Vol. 1 (2004)

Contributors 
 Iris Abraham
 Sandra Crough
 Zee Edgell
 Helen Elliot Rocke
 Carol Fonseca
 Shannon Gillett
 Mary Gomez Parham
 Yvette Holland
 Ivory Kelly
 Lydia Loskot
 Myrna Manzanares
 Corinth Morter Lewis
 Ingrid Reneau.

Vol. 2 (2005)

Contributors 
 Minerva Aponte-Jolly
 Jessie Nuñez Castillo
 Sandra Crough
 Holly Edgell
 Zee Edgell
 Zoila Ellis
 Kathy Esquivel
 Felicia Hernandez
 Yvette Holland
 Arifah Lightburn
 Myrna Manzanares
 Melba Marin-Velasquez
 Sylvia Nablo de Vasquez
 Natalie Williams
 Gorlee Marin

References

Willy A. Villalda; Jemmy M. Morales; Evelyn N. Flores

External links
 BWS site at Cubola Productions

1995 establishments in Belize
Belizean literature
Belizean writers
Education in Belize
Series of books
Publications established in 1995